"Say It with Music" is a popular song written by Irving Berlin. It was introduced in the Music Box Revue of 1921, where it was the de facto theme song and sung as a duet. The song was popularised by Paul Whiteman and His Orchestra on 30 August 1921; this recording debuted on the charts on 12 November of that year, remained there for 14 weeks and peaked at number 1. Other popular versions in 1921/22 were by John Steel and by Ben Selvin.

"Say It with Music" became the theme song of all subsequent Music Box Revues. Ethel Merman sang it in the 1938 film Alexander's Ragtime Band.

Other artists who have recorded versions of the song include Jack Payne, who made it his signature tune, Pat Boone (1957) and Dick Haymes (with Carmen Cavallaro in 1947 for Decca No. 24420).

References

External links 
Recording by Paul Whiteman and His Orchestra
Recording by John Steel
Recording by Jack Payne and his BBC Dance Orchestra

Songs written by Irving Berlin
Songs about music
1921 songs
1921 singles
1921 compositions